Hap Mun Bay Beach or Half Moon Bay Beach is a gazetted beach located facing Hap Mun Bay in the southern side of Sharp Island, Sai Kung District, Hong Kong. The beach has barbecue pits and is managed by the Leisure and Cultural Services Department of the Hong Kong Government. The beach is 99 metres long and is rated as good to fair by the Environmental Protection Department for its water quality in the past twenty years. There are views of Tai Ngam Hau from the beach.

History
On 12 July 2020, a 77-year-old man had drowned while swimming near the beach. He was unconscious when he was rescued by a lifeguard and returned to Sai Kung town centre by kai-to. He was then taken to Tseung Kwan O Hospital where he was pronounced dead.

Usage
The beach offers clear water, silvery sand and is surrounded by wooded hills, making it a popular holiday destination. The beach is also accessible by kai-to from Sai Kung Public Pier.

Features
The beach has the following features:
 BBQ pits (22 nos.)
 Changing rooms
 Showers
 Toilets
 Refreshment kiosk
 Water sports centre

See also
 Beaches of Hong Kong

References

External links 

 Official website

Sai Kung District
Beaches of Hong Kong